Haplanthodes is a genus in the plant family Acanthaceae. It is endemic to India.

Species
Haplanthodes plumosa
Haplanthodes tentaculata
Haplanthodes verticillatus

References 

Acanthaceae genera
Acanthaceae